The Spaghetti Family is an Italian animated television series created by Bruno Bozzetto and produced by The Animation Band, Mondo TV and Rai Fiction, and animated by SEK Studio. It debuted on Rai 3 in December 2003.

The show was conceived in 1996 by Bozzetto, who was inspired by his family, and a pilot was shown at the first Cartoons on the Bay festival that year. The show won the Pulcinella d’Oro award at the 2003 Cartoons on the Bay.

References

External links
The Spaghetti Family - Rai Gulp 
Cartoni Online page 
 Archived official English site

2003 Italian television series debuts
2000s Italian television series
Italian children's animated television series
Animated television series about families